F9, F09, F.IX, F 9 or F-9 may refer to:

Transport and vehicles
 EMD F9, a locomotive in the 1950s
 F-9 Flying Fortress, a variant of the B-17 Flying Fortress
 F9C Sparrowhawk, a biplane parasite fighter from the 1930s
 Falcon 9, a rocket of SpaceX
 Falconar F9A, a Canadian homebuilt aircraft design
 Farrier F-9, a New Zealand trimaran sailboat 
 Fokker F.IX, a 1929 Dutch airliner
 Frontier Airlines, IATA code F9, an American low-cost carrier 
 Grumman F9F Panther, a United States Navy fighter aircraft
 Grumman F-9 Cougar, a swept wing version of the F9F Panther
 LSWR F9 class, British locomotives of the Southern Railway
F9, Sydney Ferries' Watsons Bay Ferry Services

Other uses
 F9 (film), a film in the Fast & Furious franchise
 F 9 Säve, a former Swedish Air Force wing
 F9 (classification), a wheelchair sport classification
 F-9 Park (Fatima Jinnah Park), a public recreational area in Islamabad
 F9 Financial Reporting, a financial reporting software application
 Factor IX, a coagulation factor
 , a function key on a computer keyboard

See also
 9F (disambiguation)
 Fix (disambiguation)